The Microhylidae, commonly known as narrow-mouthed frogs, are a geographically widespread family of frogs. The 683 species are in 57 genera and 11 subfamilies.

Evolution
A molecular phylogenetic study by van der Meijden, et al. (2007) has estimated the initial internal divergence of the family Microhylidae to have taken place about 66 million years ago, or immediately after the Cretaceous extinction event. The most recent common ancestor of the Microhylidae and their closest ranoid relatives is estimated to have lived 116 million years ago in Gondwana.

Description
As suggested by their name, microhylids are mostly small frogs. They can be arboreal or terrestrial, and some even live close to water. The ground-dwellers are often found under leaf litter within forests, occasionally venturing out at night to hunt. The two main shapes for the microhylids are wide bodies and narrow mouths and normal frog proportions. Those with narrow mouths generally eat termites and ants, and the others have diets typical of most frogs. Egg-laying habits are highly varied.

Reproduction
The microhylids of New Guinea and Australia completely bypass the tadpole stage, with direct development from egg to frog. The arboreal species can therefore lay the eggs within the trees, and never need venture to the ground. Where species do have tadpoles, these almost always lack the teeth or horny beaks typical of the tadpoles of other families.

Anatomy
The skull has paired palatines and frontoparietals. The facial nerve passes through the anterior acoustic foramen in the auditory capsule; the trigeminal and facial nerve ganglia are fused to form a prootic ganglion. The eight (or seven) presacral holochordal vertebrae are all procoelous except for a biconcave surface on last presacral. The pectoral girdle is firmisternal and some show reduced clavicle and procoracoids. The terminal phalanges are blunt, pointed, or T-shaped. The tadpole lacks keratinized mouth parts and has a large spiracular chamber emptied by a caudomedial spiracle.

Taxonomy
 subfamily Adelastinae Peloso, Frost, Richards, Rodrigues, Donnellan, Matsui, Raxworthy, Biju, Lemmon, Lemmon, & Wheeler, 2015
 genus Adelastes Zweifel, 1986
 subfamily Asterophryinae Günther, 1858
 genus Aphantophryne Fry, 1917
 genus Asterophrys Tschudi, 1838
 genus Austrochaperina Fry, 1912
 genus Barygenys Parker, 1936
 genus Callulops Boulenger, 1888
 genus Choerophryne Van Kampen, 1914
 genus Cophixalus Boettger, 1892
 genus Copiula Méhely, 1901
 genus Gastrophrynoides Noble, 1926
 genus Hylophorbus Macleay, 1878
 genus Mantophryne Boulenger, 1897
 genus Oninia Günther, Stelbrink & von Rintelen, 2010
 genus Oreophryne Boettger, 1895
 genus Paedophryne Kraus, 2010
 genus Siamophryne Suwannapoom, Sumontha, Tunprasert, Ruangsuwan, Pawangkhanant, Korost, and Poyarkov, 2018
 genus Sphenophryne Peters & Doria, 1878
 genus Vietnamophryne Poyarkov, Suwannapoom, Pawangkhanant, Aksornneam, Duong, Korost and Che, 2018
 genus Xenorhina Peters, 1863
 subfamily Chaperininae Peloso, Frost, Richards, Rodrigues, Donnellan, Matsui, Raxworthy, Biju, Lemmon, Lemmon, & Wheeler, 2015
 genus Chaperina Mocquard, 1892
 subfamily Cophylinae Cope, 1889
 genus Anilany Scherz, Vences, Rakotoarison, Andreone, Köhler, Glaw, and Crottini, 2016
 genus Anodonthyla Müller, 1892
 genus Cophyla Boettger, 1880
 genus Madecassophryne Guibé, 1974
 genus Mini Scherz, Hutter, Rakotoarison, Riemann, Rödel, Ndriantsoa, Glos, Roberts, Crottini, Vences & Glaw, 2019
 genus Plethodontohyla Boulenger, 1882
 genus Rhombophryne Boettger, 1880
 genus Stumpffia Botteger, 1881
 subfamily Dyscophinae Boulenger, 1882
 genus Dyscophus Grandidier, 1872
 subfamily Gastrophryninae Fitzinger, 1843
 genus Arcovomer Carvalho, 1954
 genus Chiasmocleis Méhely, 1904
 genus Ctenophryne Mocquard, 1904
 genus Dasypops Miranda-Ribeiro, 1924
 genus Dermatonotus Méhely, 1904
 genus Elachistocleis Parker, 1927
 genus Gastrophryne Fitzinger, 1843
 genus Hamptophryne Carvalho, 1954
 genus Hypopachus Keferstein, 1867
 genus Myersiella Carvalho, 1954
 genus Stereocyclops Cope, 1870
 subfamily Hoplophryninae Noble, 1931
 genus Hoplophryne Barbour & Loveridge, 1928
 genus Parhoplophryne Barbour & Loveridge, 1928
 subfamily Kalophryninae Mivart, 1869
 genus Kalophrynus Tschudi, 1838
 subfamily Melanobatrachinae Noble, 1931
 genus Melanobatrachus Beddome, 1878
 subfamily Microhylinae Günther, 1858
 genus Glyphoglossus Gunther, 1869 "1868"
 genus Kaloula Gray, 1831
 genus Metaphrynella Parker, 1934
 genus Microhyla Tschudi, 1838
 genus Micryletta Dubois, 1987
 genus Mysticellus Sonali & Biju, 2019
genus Nanohyla 
 genus Phrynella Boulenger, 1887
 genus Uperodon Duméril & Bibron, 1841
 subfamily Otophryninae Wassersug & Pyburn, 1987
 genus Otophryne Boulenger, 1900
 genus Synapturanus Carvalho, 1954
 subfamily Phrynomerinae Noble, 1931
 genus Phrynomantis Peters, 1867
 subfamily Scaphiophryninae Laurent, 1946
 genus Paradoxophyla Blommers-Schlösser & Blanc, 1991
 genus Scaphiophryne Boulenger, 1882

Range
Frogs from the Microhylidae occur throughout the tropical and warm temperate regions of North America, South America, Africa, eastern India, Sri Lanka, Southeast Asia, New Guinea, and Australia. Although most are found in tropical or subtropical regions, a few species can be found in arid or nontropical areas. They are the majority of frog species in New Guinea and Madagascar.

The ranges of each subfamily are:
Hoplophryninae: Africa
Scaphiophryninae: Madagascar
Dyscophinae: Madagascar
Microhylinae: Southeast Asia, East Asia, South Asia
Asterophryinae: Australia, New Guinea
Phrynomerinae: Africa
Kalophryninae: Southeast Asia
Otophyninae: South America
Cophylinae: Madagascar
Gastrophryninae: New World
Melanobatrachinae: South Asia
Chaperininae: Southeast Asia
Adelastinae: South America

References

External links

 
Extant Miocene first appearances
Taxa named by Albert Günther
Amphibian families